Mark Lovatt (born 12 August 1971) is a British road racing cyclist who represented the United Kingdom at the 2001 UCI Road World Championships and England at the 2002 Commonwealth Games.

Based in England, Lovatt has won the Tour of the Peak Premier Calendar race six times, the Premier Calendar series in 2000 and 2003, and the National Hill Climb Championships in 2002 while riding for the Compensation Group R.T.

Results
1994    3rd in National Championship, Road, Amateurs, Great-Britain (GBR)  
  
2000    1st in Havant International GP (GBR)  

2000    1st in Stage 1 Girvan Three Day (GBR)  

2001    1st in Stokesley (GBR)  

2001    1st in Naseby (GBR)  

2001    1st in Ingleby (GBR)  

2001    1st in Sheriff Hutton (GBR)  

2001    1st in Oakley (GBR)  

2001    1st in Tour of the Peak (GBR)  

2001    1st in Tour of the Reservoir (GBR)

2002    1st in Shay Elliot Memorial (IRL)  

2002    1st in Stage 3 Tour of Northumberland (GBR) 

2002    1st in Stage 1 Ras Mumhan, Ras Mumhan (IRL)   

2002    1st in Tour of the Reservoir (GBR)  

2002    1st in St.-Helens (GBR)  
  
2002    1st in Neil Gardner Memorial (GBR)  

2002    1st in Tour of the Peak (GBR)  

2002    1st in John Walker Memorial (GBR)  

2003    1st in Manx International (GBR)  

2003    1st in Tour of the Peak (GBR)  

2003    1st in Stage 3 Girvan Three Day, Electric Brae (GBR)  

2003    1st in Lincoln International GP (GBR)  

2003    1st in Five Valleys Premier Calendar Road Race (GBR)  

2003    1st in Port Talbot-Five Valleys (GBR)   

2003    1st in Stage 2 Tour of Northumberland, Ashingtow (GBR)  
    
2006    1st in A.A. Brown Duncan Murray Wines Road Race (GBR)

References

1971 births
Living people
English male cyclists
Commonwealth Games competitors for England
Cyclists at the 2002 Commonwealth Games
Sportspeople from Leek, Staffordshire